Modern Farmer is a 2014 South Korean television series starring Lee Hong-gi, Park Min-woo, Lee Si-eon, Kwak Dong-yeon, and Lee Hanee. It aired on SBS from October 18 to December 21, 2014 on Saturdays and Sundays at 20:45 for 20 episodes.

Plot
Members of rock band Excellent Souls (ExSo) decide to give up their life in Seoul and move to a small town in the countryside to farm the land that Lee Min-ki's grandmother left to him upon her death. When Min-ki gets there, he learns that the village leader is his first love, Kang Yoon-hee.

Cast

Lee Hong-gi as Lee Min-ki
Park Min-woo as Kang Hyeok
Lee Si-eon as Yoo Han-cheol
Kwak Dong-yeon as Han Ki-joon
Lee Hanee as Kang Yoon-hee
Lee Han-wi as Kang Young-sik	
Lee Il-hwa as Yoon Hye-jung	
Kim Jae-hyun as Park Hong-gu
Hwang Jae-won as Kang Min-ho	
Kim Byung-ok as Han In-ki
Park Jin-joo as Han Sang-eun	
Jo Sang-gun as Park Deuk-chool	
Kim Bu-seon as Lee Yong-nyeo
Seo Dong-won as Park Sang-deuk	
Kwon Mina as Lee Soo-yeon
Park Young-soo as Hwang Man-gu
Oh Young-shil as Kim Soon-boon	
Jo Woo-ri as Hwang Yi-ji
Kim Ju-hyeon as Song Hwa-ran
Jung Shi-ah as Yoo Mi-young
Jang Seo-hee as Choi Eun-woo
Han Bo-reum as Han Yoo-na	
Yoo Ji-yeon as Yoon Mi-ja
Kim Won-hae as Doksa ("poisonous snake")
Kim Ji-eun as Mi-na	
Nam Myung-ryul as Hospital director Kang
Lee Do-kyung as Assemblyman Kim
--- as Assemblyman Kim's assistant
Ryu Hye-rin as High school girl (ep 1)
Jung Kyu-soo as Physician
Choi Jong-hoon as Village head of Sangdurok-ri (ep 5)
Shim Kwon-ho as Wrestling athlete from Sangdurok-ri (ep 5)
Lee Do-yeon as Bong-ryun
Park Wan-kyu as President of Rock Club
 Kim Byung-chul as Han-cheol's boss

Ratings
 In the table below, the blue numbers represent the lowest ratings and the red numbers represent the highest ratings.

Awards and nominations

References

External links
  
 

Seoul Broadcasting System television dramas
2014 South Korean television series debuts
2014 South Korean television series endings
Korean-language television shows
South Korean romantic comedy television series